Alexander William Molano (born April 10, 1992) is an American professional soccer player.

Career
Molano signed with Dinamo Zagreb in 2009, spending two seasons with their academy before moving to Sweden with Bodens. He made five appearances for Bodens before returning to Croatia a year later to join NK Vrapče, and again returning to Sweden with Bodens in 2013, where he tallied two assists in eight appearances.

Molano came back to the United States in 2014, playing with fifth-tier National Premier Soccer League side Dallas City FC in both 2014 and 2015.

Molano returned to professional soccer in January 2016, signing with United Soccer League side Swope Park Rangers. He scored his first goal with a 95th-minute equalizing free kick against Colorado Springs Switchbacks FC on July 20, 2016.

Molano signed with the Major Arena Soccer League's Dallas Sidekicks on September 18, 2019. His father Willie Molano had played for the original Dallas Sidekicks from 1987 to 1990.

References

1992 births
Living people
People from Grapevine, Texas
American expatriate sportspeople in Croatia
American soccer players
Bodens BK players
Sporting Kansas City II players
North Carolina FC players
Colorado Springs Switchbacks FC players
Association football midfielders
Soccer players from Texas
Sportspeople from the Dallas–Fort Worth metroplex
National Premier Soccer League players
USL Championship players
Major Arena Soccer League players
Dallas Sidekicks (PASL/MASL) players
United Premier Soccer League players
National Independent Soccer Association players
American sportspeople of Colombian descent
Expatriate footballers in Croatia
American expatriate soccer players
Expatriate footballers in Sweden
American expatriate sportspeople in Sweden